Barbels are group of small carp-like freshwater fish, almost all of the genus Barbus. They are usually found in gravel and rocky-bottomed slow-flowing waters with high dissolved oxygen content. A typical adult barbel can range from 25 to 100 cm in length and weigh between 200 g and 10 kg, although weights of 200 g are more common. Babies weigh 100–150 g.

Barbel roe is poisonous and causes vomiting and diarrhea in some people. However, the fish itself can be eaten and recipes are available in The Illustrated London Cookery Book by Frederick Bishop.

The name barbel derived from the Latin barba, meaning beard, a reference to the two pairs of barbels, a longer pair pointing forwards and slightly down positioned, on the side of the mouth.

Fish described as barbels by English-speaking people may not be known as barbels in their native country, although the root of the word may be similar. For instance, the Mediterranean barbel (Barbus meridionalis) is known as barbeau méridional or barbeau truité in France, but also as drogan, durgan, tourgan, turquan and truitat.

Europe
Barbus barbus, the barbel native to Great Britain, is known simply as the barbel and is a popular sport fish. Subspecies of B. barbus are recognised; namely B. barbus bocagei, B. barbus sclateri, B. barbus thessalus  and B. barbus plebejus.

The Mediterranean barbel (Barbus meridionalis) is found in Spain, France, Poland, Romania and Ukraine. It is a much smaller fish than B. barbus.

Other barbel in Europe include Barbus sclateri, sometimes known as the European barbel; the Italian barbel (Barbus tyberinus); the Albanian barbel (Barbus albanicus); and the Iberian barbel, which is found in Spain and Portugal and is eaten by many European duck species.

Asia
The Crimean barbel (Barbus tauricus) is found in the Salgir River in the Crimean peninsula.  A sub-species, the Kuban barbel (Barbus tauricus kubanicus) is found in the upper and middle Kuban River in Russia.

The Aral barbel (Barbus brachycephalus) is found in Central Asia, and the sub-species B. brachycephalus caspius (the Caspian Barbel) is found in the Caspian Sea.

The Bulatmai barbel (Barbus capito carpito, formerly Cyprinus capito) is found in the Kura river in Trans-caucasia.

The Terek barbel (Barbus ciscaucasicus) is found in the Kuma River, Russia.

The Turkestan barbel (Barbus conocephalus) is found in the Zeravshan river.

The Gokcha barbel (Barbus goktschaicus) is found in the Lake Sevan in Armenia.

The Kura barbel (Barbus lacerta formerly Mtkvari barbel) is found in Syria.

The Himri barbel (Barbus luteus) is native to Mesopotamian rivers.

The Amur barbel or Barbel steed (Hemibarbus labeo) is found in the Amur basin and elsewhere in east and south-east Asia, including south-east Siberia.

Africa
Barbus callensis is found in Tunisia.

The Ripon barbel (Barbus altianalis) is found in the African Great Lakes.

Labeobarbus bynni bynni is found in the Nile and lakes that have been connected to that river. The sub-species Barbus bynni occidentalis is known as the Niger barb.

Other
Occasionally non-cyprinid fish are called barbels such as Austroglanis  gilli, or Schilbe mystus, both are catfish. Some species of the genus Sinocyclocheilus a cave dwelling fish found in China have made use of the term barbel in their English common name.

Literary references
The barbel is mentioned in Nostradamus Les Prophéties, century VII, 24 :

Fishing for barbel
Barbel, although often found in still waters, are predominantly a river-dwelling fish and are sought by many anglers. They may not be the most elusive fish in the river; in the right conditions they are fairly easy to catch. They are hardy fish who will fight right until the landing net is slipped under them. Despite this hardy nature in the water they do not cope well out of the water, and must be returned safely and quickly. It is good practice to support the fish in the water until it is fully recovered and swims away on its own.

Some of the best barbel fishing venues are along the Loddon near Reading. The Severn at Bewdley is a particular hotspot where there are different day ticket and club stretches on both sides of the bank.

The UK Barbel record (21 lb 2oz, 9.58 kg) was landed by Colin Smithson from the River Rother at Fittleworth West Sussex in 2019

See also

Genus Barbus All barbels are of the genus Barbus but not all Barbus species are barbels.
Barbus barbus The barbel native to England and parts of Europe.
Barbel (anatomy) The whiskerlike structures that give the barbel its name.

References

Barbus
Fish of Central Asia
Fish common names
Freshwater fish of Europe